Czech Republic has participated at the Youth Olympic Games in every edition since the inaugural 2010 Games and has earned medals from every edition.

Medal tables

Medals by Summer Games

Medals by Winter Games

Medals by summer sport

Medals by winter sport

List of medalists

Summer Games

Summer Games medalists as part of Mixed-NOCs Team

Winter Games

Winter Games medalists as part of Mixed-NOCs Team

Flag bearers

See also
Czech Republic at the Olympics
Czech Republic at the Paralympics

 
Sport in the Czech Republic
Nations at the Youth Olympic Games